The manat (abbreviation: m; code: TMT) is the currency of Turkmenistan. The original manat was introduced on 1 November 1993, replacing the rouble at a rate of 1 manat = Rbls 500. The manat is subdivided into 100 tenge.

Due to heavy inflation a new manat was introduced on 1 January 2009 at the rate of 5,000 old manats to 1 new manat.

Etymology
The word "manat" is derived from the Persian word "munāt" and the Russian word "монета" ("moneta") meaning "coin". It was used as the name of the Soviet currency in Turkmen and in Azeri.

Coins
In 1993, coins were introduced in denominations of 1, 5, 10, 20, and 50 tenge. The 1, 5, and 10 tenge were struck in copper-plated-steel, with the higher denominations in nickel-plated-steel. This first series of coins was short lived as their metal value soon became worth more than their actual face value. After a period of high inflation, new coins of 500 and 1,000 manats were introduced in 1999. All coins of this period had to depict the incumbent president by law.

During the monetary reform of 2009, new coins of 1, 2, 5, 10, 20, and 50 tenge were issued with bimetallic 1 and 2 manats following in 2010. The 1, 2, and 5 tenge are nickel-plated steel while the 10, 20, and 50 tenge are struck in brass. Instead of depicting the current head of state the coins feature a map of Turkmenistan with the Independence Tower superimposed in front of it. All circulating coins of Turkmenistan are struck by the Royal Mint.

Banknotes

First manat (TMM, 1993—2009)

In 1993, manat notes were introduced in denominations of 1, 5, 10, 20, 50, 100, and 500 manats, replacing the Soviet rouble. These were followed by notes for 1,000 manats in 1995 and 5,000 and 10,000 manats in 1996. In 2005, a new series of notes was introduced in denominations of 50, 100, 500, 1,000, 5,000, and 10,000 manats. All notes, with exception of the 1 and 5 manat banknotes bear a portrait of former president Saparmurat Niyazov. All Turkmen banknotes are produced by the De La Rue printing and banknote company.

First manat (second issue)
In 2005, a new series of manat banknotes was introduced. They had originally been intended to replace the first manat at a fixed rate, with 1 equal to 1,000 of the first manat, but the revaluation was postponed and this issue was released to circulate with previous manat issues. The series of notes was introduced in denominations of 50, 100, 500, 1,000, 5,000, and 10,000 manats. Two new coins were also introduced in only two denominations, 500 and 1,000 manats. Both the first and second issue manat banknotes circulated in tandem until the issue of the redenominated issue in 2009.

Second manat
After hyperinflation significantly devalued the currency, a new manat with a fixed exchange rate was introduced, replacing the old manat on a ratio of 5,000 old manats = 1 new manat. Banknotes in this series were printed in denominations of 1, 5, 10, 20, 50, 100, and 500 manats. As part of an effort by the Turkmen government to dismantle Niyazov's extensive cult of personality and help politically disambiguate the current rule, only the highest valued banknote, 500 manats, bears a portrait of the former leader. The 500 manat note has yet to be released into circulation. The other denominations feature images of buildings in Ashgabat or technological achievements (TurkmenSat 1)  and portraits of Ahmed Sanjar, Oghuz Khan, Magtymguly Pyragy and other figures in Turkmen history.

Exchange rates
Before Apr 2009: US$1 = 1.04 manat
Apr 2009 - Jan 2015: US$1 = 2.85 manats
Jan 2015 onwards: US$1 = 3.5 manats

A black market for exchange rate exists as cash exchanges are forbidden by law in Turkmenistan. The parallel exchange rate varied between 40–41m per U.S. dollar .

See also
Economy of Turkmenistan
Azerbaijani manat

Notes

References

External links
 New currency samples - images of the new 2009 Manat
 

Currencies of Turkmenistan
Currencies introduced in 1993